Warren Coleman (24 August 1900 – 13 January 1968 in West Tisbury, Martha's Vineyard) was an American operatic baritone.  He created the roles of Crown in George Gershwin's Porgy and Bess and the role of John Kumalo in Kurt Weill's Lost in the Stars, in the premieres of each show on Broadway.

Coleman performed regularly on the Broadway stage from 1934 until 1950.  In addition to Lost in the Stars and two productions of Porgy and Bess, Coleman also starred in Roll, Sweet Chariot, Sing Out the News, and Anna Lucasta.

References

External links

American operatic baritones
American male musical theatre actors
1900 births
1968 deaths
20th-century American male actors
20th-century American male opera singers